Vincent Jules Auriol (27 August 1884 – 1 January 1966) was a French politician who served as President of France from 1947 to 1954.

Early life and politics
Auriol was born in Revel, Haute-Garonne, as the only child of Jacques Antoine Auriol (1855–1933), a baker nicknamed Paul, and Angélique Virginie Durand (1861–1945). His great-grandmother, Anne Auriol, was a first cousin of English engineer Isambard Kingdom Brunel. He earned a law degree at the Collège de Revel in 1904 and began his career as a lawyer in Toulouse. A committed socialist, Auriol co-founded the newspaper Le Midi Socialiste in 1908; he was head of the Association of Journalists in Toulouse at this time.

In 1914, Auriol entered the Chamber of Deputies as a Socialist Deputy for Muret, a position he retained until 1942. He also served as Mayor of Muret from 3 May 1925 to 17 January 1947, and as a member of the Conseil Général of Haute-Garonne from 1928 to 17 January 1947. In December 1920, after the breakup of the SFIO, Auriol refused to join the newly created SFIC and became one of the leaders of the new SFIO (the remaining socialist minority), along with Léon Blum.

Auriol became the party's leading spokesman on financial issues. He chaired the Finance Committee in the Chamber of Deputies from 1924 to 1926. His first cabinet post was as Minister of Finance under Léon Blum, in which Auriol controversially devalued the French franc 30% against the United States dollar, leading to capital flight and greater economic unease. This and Blum's proposals for greater regulatory restrictions on industry led to Blum's resignation as Premier; in the next government, led by Camille Chautemps, Auriol was made Minister of Justice, then later he was appointed as Minister of Coordination of Services of the Presidency of the Council in Blum's short-lived government in 1938. Édouard Daladier's conservative–Radical government formed on 10 April 1938 returned Auriol to the Chamber of Deputies.

Auriol was one of the 80 deputies who voted against the extraordinary powers given to Prime Minister Philippe Pétain on 10 July 1940 that brought about the Nazi-backed Vichy government. As a result, he was placed under house arrest until he escaped to the French Resistance in October 1942, and fought with the resistance for a year. Auriol fled to London in October 1943. He represented the Socialists at the Free French Consultative Assembly (organized by Charles de Gaulle in Algiers later that year). In July 1944, he represented France at the United Nations Monetary and Financial Conference at Bretton Woods, United States.

Postwar life and presidency
After World War II, Auriol served as Minister of State in de Gaulle's provisional government. He was a member of the Constituent Assemblies which drafted the constitution of the short-lived French Fourth Republic, and was President of the Assemblies. He lobbied for a "third force" as an alternative to both Communism and Gaullism. Auriol led the French delegation to the United Nations and was France's first representative on the United Nations Security Council in 1946. He served as a Deputy for Haute-Garonne in the National Assembly from 1946 until 31 December 1947. Meanwhile, the National Assembly elected him on 16 January 1947 as the first President of the Fourth Republic by a wide margin, receiving 452 votes (51.19%) against the 242 (27.41%) for the People's Republican Movement (MRP) candidate, Auguste Champetier de Ribes.

As president, Auriol pursued a relatively weak presidency like the office under the Third Republic. He attempted to reconcile political factions within France and warm relations between France and its allies. He was criticized for France's ailing economy and political turmoil in the postwar period, and the war in Indochina. A series of debilitating strikes were waged across France in 1947, initiated by the Confédération Générale du Travail. The strikes escalated into violence in November of that year, leading, on 28 November, to the government deploying 80,000 French Army reservists to face the "insurrection". The Communist Party, who often supported the strikes, were expelled from the legislature in early December. The strikes ended on 10 December, but more would come in 1948, and again in 1953 in response to the Joseph Laniel government's austerity program.

Apart from the inconclusive war in Indochina, France's colonial empire decayed under Auriol's presidency. Clashes in Morocco, Madagascar, Algeria, and Tunisia became more frequent; an Algerian independence movement, the Front de Libération Nationale, was founded in 1951, and in 1953 the French overthrew Mohammed V, the Sultan of Morocco, after he demanded greater autonomy. France fought an uprising in Madagascar and imprisoned Tunisian independence leader Habib Bourguiba in 1952.

When Auriol's term as president expired, he did not run for re-election, and was succeeded by René Coty as President of France on 16 January 1954. Auriol commented on leaving office: "The work was killing me; they called me out of bed at all hours of the night to receive resignations of prime ministers" (there were eighteen different governments during his seven years as president.)

After his presidency, Auriol assumed the role of elder statesman, and wrote articles on political topics. Auriol became a member of the Constitutional Council of France in 1958 at the establishment of the French Fifth Republic; he resigned from the SFIO in the same year. He unsuccessfully lobbied against the constitution in the 1958 national referendum, and resigned from his position on the Constitutional Council in 1960 to protest the growing power of Charles de Gaulle's presidency. In 1965, he endorsed François Mitterrand for the presidency.

On 1 January 1966, Vincent Auriol died in hospital in the 7th arrondissement of Paris and was buried at Muret, Haute-Garonne.

Personal life
On 1 June 1911, Auriol married Michelle Aucoutuier (5 March 1895 – 21 January 1979). Aroud seven to eight years later, the couple was blessed with a son, Paul (1919–1992) and the aviatrix Jacqueline Auriol was his daughter-in-law.

See also
 Politics of France

References

Sources
 Scouting Round the World, John S. Wilson, first edition, Blandford Press 1959, p. 150
  Biography on the French National Assembly's website 
  French National Archives

Notes

External links

 Biography on governmental site Chemins de la Mémoire
 
 

|-

|-

|-

1884 births
1966 deaths
20th-century presidents of France
20th-century Princes of Andorra
People from Haute-Garonne
People of the Cold War
Politicians from Occitania (administrative region)
French Section of the Workers' International politicians
French Ministers of Finance
Government ministers of France
Members of the 11th Chamber of Deputies of the French Third Republic
Members of the 12th Chamber of Deputies of the French Third Republic
Members of the 13th Chamber of Deputies of the French Third Republic
Members of the 14th Chamber of Deputies of the French Third Republic
Members of the 15th Chamber of Deputies of the French Third Republic
Members of the 16th Chamber of Deputies of the French Third Republic
Members of the Constituent Assembly of France (1945)
Members of the Constituent Assembly of France (1946)
Presidents of the National Assembly (France)
Deputies of the 1st National Assembly of the French Fourth Republic
The Vichy 80
Bretton Woods Conference delegates
20th-century French lawyers
University of Toulouse alumni